Minister of labour (in British English) or labor (in American English) is typically a cabinet-level position with portfolio responsibility  for setting national labour standards, labour dispute mechanisms, employment, workforce participation, training and social security.

Lists

The position exist in many countries with several different names:
 Minister of Labor, Social Affairs, and Equal Opportunities (Albania)
 Minister of Labor, Employment, and Social Security (Argentina)
 Minister of Labour, Family and Youth (Austria)
 Minister of Labor and Social Protection of the Population (Azerbaijan)
 Ministry of Labour (Barbados)
 Minister of Work, Employment, and Social Security (Bolivia)
 Minister of Labour (Burma)
 Minister of Labour (Bhutan)
 Minister of Employment, Workforce, and Labour (Canada)
 Minister of Labour and Immigration (Manitoba)
 Minister of Labour (Ontario)
 Minister of Labour (Quebec)
 Minister of Human Resources and Social Security (China)
 Secretary for Labour and Welfare (Hong Kong)
 Minister of Labour (Colombia)
 Minister of Employment (Denmark)
 Minister of Social Affairs and Employment (Netherlands)
 Minister of Labour (Germany)
 Minister of Labour and Employment (India)
 Minister of Manpower (Indonesia)
 Minister of Cooperatives, Labour and Social Welfare (Iran)
 Minister for Labour (Ireland, dissolved)
 Minister of Labor, Social Affairs and Social Services (Israel)
 Minister of Health, Labour, and Welfare (Japan)
 Minister of Social Security and Labour (Lithuania)
 Minister of Labor and Social Policy (Macedonia)
 Minister of Human Resources (Malaysia)
 Secretary of Labor (Mexico)
 Minister of Labor, Family, and Social Protection (Moldova)
 Minister of Labour (New Zealand)
 Minister of Labour and Productivity (Nigeria)
 Minister of Labor (North Korea)
 Minister of Labour and Social Inclusion (Norway)
 Secretary of Labor and Employment (Philippines)
 Minister of Labor, Family, and Social Protection (Romania)
 Minister of Manpower (Singapore)
 Minister of Employment (Sweden)
 Ministry of Labor (Taiwan)
 Ministry of Labour (Thailand)
 Minister of Labour and Social Security (Turkey)
 Minister of Social Policy (Ukraine)
 Secretary of State for Employment (United Kingdom)
 Minister of Labour (Northern Ireland)
 Secretary of Labor (United States)
 Ministry of Labour, Invalids and Social Affairs (Vietnam)

References

 
 
Labour